Princess Christina Ingesdotter of Sweden (Swedish: Kristina Ingesdotter) (11th century – 18 January 1122) was a Swedish princess and a princess consort of Veliky Novgorod, Rostov and Belgorod, by marriage to Grand Prince Mstislav I of Kiev.

Life
Christina was the daughter of King Inge the Elder of Sweden and Queen Helena. Helena was the sister of Blot-Sven King of Sweden. She was likely the eldest of the three royal daughters, being married before her sisters Margaret and Catherine.

Christina was married to Mstislav, who was Prince of Veliky Novgorod, Rostov, and Belgorod during their marriage, thereby giving her the equivalent titles. According to Vasily Tatishchev they married in 1095. Polish historian Dariusz Dąbrowski stated that Tatischev didn't base on reliable source. Christina married Mstislav between 1090 and 1096.

The personal seal of Christina has been found by archaeologists, depicting a woman with a crown and the aureola of a saint and the inscription "Saint Christina" in Greek. Princess Christina is suggested to have been depicted as Saint Christina in the Nereditsa Church, which has been interpreted as a sign that she may have been worshiped as a local saint.
 
Her father, king Inge the Elder, died in 1110, and was succeeded on the Swedish throne by his nephews. Living in Rus, Christina was in Sweden counted as too far away to be given a share in the inheritance of her father, leaving only her younger sisters queen Margaret Fredkulla of Denmark and Catherine Ingesdotter of Sweden as their father's heirs. However, it is known that Margaret shared her inheritance with her niece Ingrid in Norway, and her niece Ingeborg in Denmark, giving them a fourth each: Ingeborg was the daughter of Christina and the only one of her children residing in Scandinavia.  She lived in Denmark after her marriage to a Danish prince some years later, which could be counted as a share in the inheritance after her mother, Christina.

Christina died on 18 January 1122. Three years after her death, her spouse Mstislav became Grand Prince of Kiev.

Issue
Christina and Mstislav had ten children:

 Ingeborg of Kiev, married Canute Lavard of Jutland, and was mother to Valdemar I of Denmark
 Malmfred, married (1) Sigurd I of Norway; (2) Eric II of Denmark
 Eupraxia, married Alexius Comnenus, son of John II Comnenus
 Vsevolod of Novgorod and Pskov
 Maria Mstislavna of Kiev, married Vsevolod II of Kiev
 Iziaslav II of Kiev
 Rostislav of Kiev
 Sviatopolk of Pskov
 Rogneda, married Yaroslav of Volinya
 Xenia, married Briachislav of Izyaslawl

References

11th-century births
1122 deaths
11th-century Swedish women
12th-century Swedish women
Christina 1100
Kievan Rus' princesses
12th-century Rus' people
12th-century Rus' women
12th-century Swedish people
Daughters of kings